The United States five-dollar bill ($5) is a denomination of United States currency. The current $5 bill features a portrait of Abraham Lincoln, the 16th U.S. president (1861-1865), on the front and the Lincoln Memorial on the back. All $5 bills issued today are Federal Reserve Notes. 

The $5 bill is sometimes nicknamed a "fin". The term has German/Yiddish roots and is remotely related to the English "five", but it is far less common today than it was in the late 19th and early 20th centuries. It is also occasionally referred to as a “fiver” in modern times.

, the average life of a $5 bill in circulation is 4.7 years before it is replaced due to wear. Approximately 6% of all paper currency produced by the U.S. Treasury's Bureau of Engraving and Printing in 2009 were $5 bills.

Current design

The redesigned $5 bill was unveiled on September 20, 2007, and was issued on March 13, 2008 during a ceremony at President Lincoln's Cottage.

Security Features
New and enhanced security features make it easier to check the new $5 bill and more difficult for potential counterfeiters to reproduce. The redesigned $5 bill has:

Watermarks: There are now two watermarks. A large numeral "5" watermark is located in a blank space to the right of the portrait, replacing the watermark portrait of President Lincoln found on previous bills. A second watermark — a new column of three smaller "5"s — has been added and is positioned to the left of the portrait.
Security thread: The embedded security thread runs vertically and is now located to the right of the portrait. The letters "USA" followed by the number "5" in an alternating pattern are visible along the thread from both sides of the bill. The thread glows blue when held under ultraviolet light (blacklight).
Microprinting: The redesigned $5 bill features microprinting, which is the engraving of tiny text, on the front of the bill in three areas: the words "FIVE DOLLARS" can be found repeated inside the left and right borders of the bill; the words "E PLURIBUS UNUM" appear at the top of the shield within the Great Seal; and the word "USA" is repeated in between the columns of the shield. On the back of the bill the words "USA FIVE" appear along one edge of the large purple "5". Because they are so small, these microprinted words are hard to replicate.

Red and Blue Threads: Some small red and blue threads are embedded into the paper to reveal if a higher denomination counterfeit bill has been printed on the bleached paper of a genuine lower denomination bill.

Infrared Ink: The back of the five-dollar bill features sections of the bill that are blanked out when viewed in the infrared spectrum. This is consistent with other high-value US bills ($5 and up), which all feature patterns of infrared-visible stripes unique to the given denomination. Bills of other world currencies, such as the Euro, also feature unique patterns visible only when viewed in this spectrum.
Anti-Photocopy Circle Pattern: Small yellow "05"s are printed to the left of the portrait on the front of the bill and to the right of the Lincoln Memorial vignette on the back. The zeros in the "05"s form a "EURion constellation" to prevent photocopying of the bill. Photocopy machines detect the particular pattern of yellow circles and refuse to make a copy. Some machines make a record of the illegal photocopy attempt, which a repair technician may report to law enforcement.

The five dollar bill lacks the optically variable ink of higher denomination US bills.

Design features
The new $5 bills remain the same size and use the same—but enhanced—portraits and historical images. The most noticeable difference is the light-purple coloring of the center of the bill, which blends into gray near the edges.

Similar to the recently redesigned $10, $20, $50, and $100 bills, the new $5 bill features an American symbol of freedom printed in the background: The Great Seal of the United States, featuring an eagle and shield, is printed in purple to the right of the portrait and an arc of purple stars surround both it and the portrait.

When the Lincoln Memorial was constructed the names of 48 states were engraved on it. The picture of the Lincoln Memorial on the $5 bill only contains the names of 26 states. These are the 26 states that can be seen on the front side of the Lincoln memorial which is what is pictured on the $5 bill.

On the back of the bill, a larger, purple numeral "5" appears in the lower right corner to help those with visual impairments to distinguish the denomination. This large "5" also includes the words "USA FIVE" in tiny white letters.

The oval borders around President Lincoln's portrait on the front, and the Lincoln Memorial vignette on the back have been removed. Both engravings have been enhanced.

Redesign
On April 20, 2016, Treasury Secretary Jacob Lew announced that the $5, $10, and $20 would all undergo redesign prior to 2020. The changes would add new features to combat counterfeiting and make them easier for blind citizens to distinguish. Lew said that while Lincoln would remain on the obverse, the reverse would be redesigned to depict various historical events that had occurred at the Lincoln Memorial. Among the planned designs are images from Martin Luther King Jr. giving his 1963 speech "I Have a Dream" and the 1939 concert by opera singer Marian Anderson. , the Treasury has continued work on the $20 bill; the redesigns of the $5 and $10 were not mentioned.

Large size note history

(approximately 7.4218 × 3.125 in ≅ 189 × 79 mm)
1861: The first $5 bill was issued as a Demand Note with a small portrait of Alexander Hamilton on the right and an allegorical statue representing freedom on the left side of the obverse.
1862: The first $5 United States Note was issued with a face design similar to the previous Demand Note and a completely revised reverse.
1869: A new $5 United States Note was issued with a small portrait of Andrew Jackson on the left and a vignette of a pioneer family in the middle.
1870: National Gold Bank Notes were issued specifically for payment in gold coin by participating banks. The obverse featured vignettes of Christopher Columbus sighting land and Columbus with an Indian Princess; the reverse featured US gold coins.
1875: The series 1869 United States Note was revised. The green tinting that was present on the obverse was removed and the design on the reverse was completely changed.
1882: A year after James A. Garfield was assassinated, a new National Banknote was issued in Brown Backs and blue seals. The Brown back had an image of an eagle on the right, and two horses with another eagle on the right. The blue seal had George Washington on the reverse.
1886: The first $5 silver certificate was issued with a portrait of Ulysses S. Grant on the obverse and five Morgan silver dollars on the reverse.
1890: Five-dollar Treasury or "Coin Notes" were issued and given for government purchases of silver bullion from the silver mining industry. The reverse featured an ornate design that occupied almost the entire note.
1891: The reverse of the 1890 Treasury Note was redesigned because the treasury felt that it was too "busy" which would make it too easy to counterfeit.
1891: The reverse of the 1886 Silver Certificate was revised; the 5 Morgan silver dollars were removed.
1896: The famous "Educational Series" Silver Certificate was issued. The entire obverse was covered with artwork representing electricity and the reverse featured portraits of Ulysses Grant and Phillip Sheridan.
1899: A new $5 silver certificate with a portrait of Running Antelope on the face was issued.
1902: Another large size National Banknote was issued and had a portrait of Benjamin Harrison on the obverse. The notes had red or blue seals.
1914: The first $5 Federal Reserve Note was issued with a portrait of Lincoln on the obverse and vignettes of Columbus sighting land and the Pilgrims' landing on the reverse. The note initially had a red treasury seal and serial numbers; however, they were changed to blue.
1915: Federal Reserve Bank Notes (not to be confused with Federal Reserve Notes) were issued by 5 Federal Reserve Banks. The obverse was similar to the 1914 Federal Reserve Notes, except for large wording in the middle of the bill and a portrait with no border on the left side of the bill. Each note was an obligation of the issuing bank and could only be redeemed at the corresponding bank.
1918: The 1915 Federal Reserve Bank Note was re-issued under series 1918 by 11 Federal Reserve banks.
1923: The $5 silver certificate was redesigned; it was nicknamed a "porthole" note due to the circular wording of THE UNITED STATES OF AMERICA around Lincoln's portrait. The reverse featured the Great Seal of the United States.

Small size note history
(6.14 × 2.61 in ≅ 156 × 66 mm)

1929: Under the Series of 1928, all small-sized notes carried a standardized design. All  bills would feature a portrait of Lincoln, the same border design on the obverse, and the Lincoln Memorial on the reverse. The  bill was issued as a United States Note with a red seal and serial numbers and as a Federal Reserve Note with a green seal and serial numbers.
1933: As an emergency response to the Great Depression, additional money was pumped into the American economy through Federal Reserve Bank Notes. This was the only small-sized  bill that had a different border design and featured a brown treasury seal and serial numbers.
1934: The redeemable in gold clause was removed from Federal Reserve Notes due to the U.S. withdrawing from the gold standard.
1934: The first  silver certificates were issued with a blue seal and serial numbers along with a blue numeral 5 on the left side of the obverse.
1942: Special World War II currency was issued.  was overprinted on the front and back of the  Federal Reserve Note; the serial numbers, and seal, were changed to brown from green. This was done so that the currency could be declared worthless in the event of a Japanese invasion. A  silver certificate with a yellow, rather than blue, treasury seal was printed for use by U.S. troops in North Africa. These notes, too, could be declared worthless if seized by the enemy.
1950: Many minor aspects on the obverse of the  Federal Reserve Note were changed. Most noticeably, the treasury and Federal Reseve seals and the  gray word , were made smaller.
1953: New  United States Notes and Silver Certificates were issued with a gray numeral 5 on the left side of the bill and the gray  with a blue seal imprinted over it on the right and blue serial numbers.
1963: Both the  United States Note and Federal Reserve Note were revised with the motto  added to the reverse and  removed from the obverse. Also, the obligation on the Federal Reserve Note was shortened to its current wording, .
1966: Production of the  United States Note ends.
1969: The  bill began using the new treasury seal with wording in English instead of Latin.
1992: The first notes at the Western Currency Facility in Fort Worth, Texas begin printing in July, during production of Series 1988A.
1994: Series 1993 $5 notes received new-age anti-counterfeiting measures, featuring microscopic printing around Lincoln's portrait and a plastic security strip on the left side of the bill.
 The  bill, however, does not feature color-shifting ink like the higher denominations. The first notes were printed in December, 1999.

Series dates

Small size

See also
 Where's George?

References

 Honest Abe to Get Makeover on $5 Bill (AP via Federal News Radio)

External links
Interactive graphic from Portfolio.com. Shows the design features and history of the $5 bill. Also, compares security features to that of the Euro.
$5 Note

1861 establishments in the United States
Currencies introduced in 1861
Abraham Lincoln in art
Five-base-unit banknotes
005